Trichopetalum is a genus of chordeumatidan millipedes known from eastern North America.

Species

Trichopetalum appropinquo
Trichopetalum cornutum
Trichopetalum dux
Trichopetalum flavidum
Trichopetalum glomeratum
Trichopetalum krekeleri
Trichopetalum lunatum
Trichopetalum montis
Trichopetalum packardi
Trichopetalum quadratum
Trichopetalum stannardi
Trichopetalum subterraneum
Trichopetalum syntheticum
Trichopetalum uncum
Trichopetalum weyeriensis
Trichopetalum whitei

References

Chordeumatida
Millipedes of North America
Millipede genera